The Roman Catholic Diocese of Kericho is a diocese located in the city of Kericho in the Ecclesiastical province of Nairobi in Kenya.

History
 December 5, 1995: Established as Diocese of Kericho from the Diocese of Nakuru.  The Diocese has 48 parishes with various religious institutions, congregations, schools, hospitals, health centers, projects and programmes.

Leadership
 Bishops of Kericho  (Latin Church)
Philip Arnold Subira Anyolo (December 6, 1995 – March 22, 2003), appointed Bishop of Homa Bay
 Emmanuel Okombo (March 23, 2003 - December 13, 2019)
 Alfred Rotich (Since December 14, 2019)

See also
Roman Catholicism in Kenya

Sources
 GCatholic.org
 Catholic Hierarchy

Roman Catholic dioceses in Kenya
Christian organizations established in 1995
Roman Catholic dioceses and prelatures established in the 20th century
Roman Catholic Ecclesiastical Province of Nairobi